Ecuadorian centavo coins were introduced in 2000 when Ecuador converted its currency from the sucre to the U.S. dollar. The coins are in denominations of 1, 5, 10, 25 and 50 centavos and are identical in size and value to their U.S. cent counterparts (although the U.S. 50-cent coin counterpart is not often seen in circulation). They circulate within Ecuador alongside coins and banknotes from the United States. Although U.S. $1 coins are rarely used in the U.S., they are commonly used in Ecuador. Ecuador managed to introduce a $1 coin (un sucre) but finally decided to not release in common circulation, only in 2000 coin sets. Ecuador does not issue any banknotes, relying on U.S. issues.

Description 
Ecuadorian centavos bear the numeric value along with the value spelled out in Spanish, and the legend of the Banco Central del Ecuador; the reverse is printed with the portrait and name of a notable Ecuadorian, the legend "República del Ecuador" and the country's coat of arms. The exception is the one-cent coin, which rather than bearing a portrait, is printed with a map of the Americas and bears the legend "" ("Light of the Americas"). Coins bear the date Año 20xx, beginning in 2000; the largest proportion of coins in circulation are from the 2000 minting. With the exception of the one-cent coin, the coins are nickel-plated steel; the "un centavo" coin is generally brass-plated steel although a few were struck in copper-plated steel. The coins are minted by the Royal Canadian Mint and the Casa de Moneda de México.

The Central Bank of Ecuador also produced a commemorative $1 (un sucre) coin for official 2000 mint sets. It was never released for circulation.

See also
 Centavo - article about the use of centavos worldwide
 Currency of Ecuador

References

Circulating currencies
Currencies of Ecuador
Currencies introduced in 2000